Alwal Lake is an artificial lake near Hyderabad, India, about 8 kilometers north of Secunderabad. It is situated in Alwal. There were many issues associated with the lake, which made a highly tensed situation for the Alwal Municipality Officials.

Location
The lake is in the heart of Alwal town, located near the secunderabad-Mumbai Railway track. The lake has a very good view from the railway track and also from the Alwal Railway Station. There is a road along the lake which gives the complete and close view of the lake.

Usage

The lake is used for many different purposes. During Ganesh Chaturthi, the Ganesh idols are immersed in the lake. At that time, the road near the lake is facilitated with extra lights and also extra police are posted for controlling the crowd.

Many birds and animals reside near the lake, and this provides a very fine view in the evening.

See also
 Osman Sagar
 Himayat Sagar
 Shamirpet Lake
 Alwal
 Hyderabad city lakes

References

Reservoirs in Telangana
Lakes of Hyderabad, India